Northumbrian dialect or Northumbrian English is any of several English language varieties spoken in the traditional English region of Northumbria, which includes most of the North East England government region. The traditional Northumbrian dialect is a moribund older form of the dialect spoken in the area which is closely related to Scots and Cumbrian and shares with them a common origin in Northumbrian Old English. 

The traditional dialect has spawned multiple modern varieties, and Northumbrian dialect can also be used to broadly include all of them:
Geordie, the most famous dialect spoken in the region, largely spoken in Tyneside, centered in Newcastle and Gateshead
Mackem, a dialect spoken in Wearside, centred on Sunderland
Smoggie, a hybrid dialect spoken in Teesside; an area at the southern tip of region which straddles the border of Yorkshire and County Durham
Pitmatic or 'Yakka', a group of dialects spoken in mining towns in Northumberland and Durham (still spoken in Ashington)
Berwick dialect, spoken in Berwick-upon-Tweed, the northernmost town in England
The only rhotic or variably rhotic dialect left in the region (Northumberland and Durham), nearly extinct, which uses the Northumbrian burr, mostly spoken today only by the oldest rural, male speakers

The term 'Northumbrian' can refer to the region of Northumbria but can also refer specifically to the county of Northumberland. This article focuses on the former definition and thus includes varieties from throughout the wider region, including Durham as well as Northumberland.

Dialect divisions

19th century
Alexander John Ellis placed the majority of Northumberland as well as northern and central parts of County Durham in his 'North Northern' dialect group, which he deemed to be a transitional variety between other Northern dialects (those north of the Humber-Lune line) and Scots. Exceptions included a small portion of northern Northumberland around the Cheviot hills, which was deemed to be Scots-speaking; and the southern part of County Durham, which was considered part of the 'West Northern' dialect group and more closely related to the dialects of Cumbria and Richmondshire. Like Cumbrian, the dialect of south Durham was subject to greater Norse influence than the rest of Durham and Northumberland. This is evident by the fact that streams in south Durham and Cumbria are typically named ‘becks’ (from the Old Norse ‘bekkr’) while 'burns' (from the Old English ‘burna’) are found in north Durham and Northumberland.

21st century
A tripartite division is recognised among modern urban dialects:
Northern Urban North-Eastern English: Tyneside and urban Northumberland 
Central Urban North-Eastern English: Sunderland and much of Durham unitary authority
Southern Urban North-Eastern English: Teesside, Hartlepool and Darlington

Phonology

Consonants

Northumbrian burr: In Northumberland and north Durham  is traditionally pronounced  or perhaps even  with burr modification penetrating further south into central Durham. Nowadays this sound is largely confined to older residents in rural Northumberland.
On Tyneside and much of Durham it is typically /w/ as in Standard English. 
In contrast to most other varieties of Northern English,  traditional dialects north of the Tees are largely H-retaining. Northumberland and north Durham dialects are fully H-retaining while south Durham dialects exhibit variable H-dropping akin to parts of Cumbria.
As with most Northern English dialects, final  sound is reduced to  e.g.  for “ganging” (“going”).
In common with most dialects of England, Northumbrian has lost .
Unlike most Northern English dialects /l/ is clear in all cases and never velarised.

Vowels
Nurse–north merger: [ɔː] in words such as bord (bird)  forst (first) throughout Northumberland and north & central Durham. This is a result of the Northumbrian burr modifying adjacent vowels.
[ɪ] in words such. As ‘’blinnd’’ (blind) and “finnd” (find).
Occurring throughout much of north & west Northumberland, the GOAT vowel in words like "phone" and "tone" moves closer to [ɜː], so "phone" would be pronounced the same as the word "fern". Amongst those with stronger accents, a similar vowel can be found in the LOT vowel, so "cod" would be pronounced with a short œ sound.
Phonemic long /aː/ (written aa or more traditionally aw). This creates some minimal pairs based upon phonemic vowel length, for example gan [gan] "go" vs. gawn [gaːn] "going".
Preservation of Old English /uː/ (written as oo), therefore down and town are  "doon" and "toon" in Northumbrian. It also retains the old English pronunciation of [ʊ] when followed by [nd], so "pound" and "found" are "pund" and "fund".
 eu or ui in words like eneugh, muin and buit, partially corresponds to Scots Vowel 7. The pronunciation of this vowel varies depending on the dialect.
The FACE vowel is typically [ɪə] or [ɪa].
Lack of foot–strut split, as in other Northern English varieties.
Older forms such as baith, stane and hame, which are shared with Scots, survive in some Northumbrian dialects.
 [iː] in words such as heed and deed meaning “head” & “dead” (compare Scots “heid” & “deid” and Yorkshire “heead” & “deead”)

Diphthongs

Berwick-upon-Tweed
Berwick-upon-Tweed is unique within Northumberland. The local speech has characteristics of the North Northumbrian dialect and due to its geographical location, has characteristics of the East Central Scots dialect as well.

A sociological study of the Anglo-Scottish border region conducted in the year 2000 found that locals of Alnwick, 30 miles (48 km) south of Berwick, associated the Berwick accent with Scottish influence. Conversely, those from Eyemouth, Scotland, 9 miles (14 km) north of Berwick, firmly classed Berwick speech as English, identifying it as Northumbrian.

Classification in relation to English and Scots
The Northumbrian Language Society (NLS), founded in 1983 to research, preserve and promote the Northumbrian language variety, considers it divergent enough to be not a dialect of Modern Standard English but, rather, a related but separate Anglic language of its own, since it is largely not comprehensible by standard English speakers. Northumbrian has perhaps an even closer relationship with Modern Scots, and both the NLS regard as distinct languages derived from Old English but close relatives; however, mainstream scholarly sources regard them as essentially the same language, albeit with minor differences. The similarities are not commonly or formally recognised possibly due to sensitivities on both sides of the border. The status of Scots and Northumbrian as either languages or dialects therefore remains open to debate.

Grammar
Northumbrian includes some weak plurals such as ee/een (eye/eyes), coo/kye (cow/cows) and shough/shoon (shoe/shoes) that survived from Old English into Northumbrian but have become strong plurals in Standard Modern English – ox/oxen and child/children being exceptions. Regular Northumbrian plurals which correspond to irregular in Standard English include loafs (loaves),  (wives) and shelfs (shelves)
T–V distinction: Use of the singular second-person pronouns thoo or tha and thee in Durham and south Northumberland. In north Northumberland only ye is encountered.
aw’s (I is) and thoo's (thou is) are the first and second person present forms of the verb "to be" in Durham and south Northumberland. In north Northumberland aw'm (I am) is used as in Scots and Standard English.
In Northumberland as well as north & central Durham the definite article is unreduced as in Standard English and Scots. This is considered a peculiarity among Northern English dialects. 
The English verb "to be able" is in Northumbrian in the older form 'te can', for example aw used te cud sing meaning I used to be able to sing.

Vocabulary

Some Northumbrian words include:

 aw / aa - I
 aboot - about
 alreet or aareet / awreet - a variation on "alright" or "hello" (often used in the phrase "aalreet mate").
 aye - yes
 bairn/grandbairn - child/grandchild
 bari - "good" or "lovely"
 banter - chat/gossip
 belta - "really good", used in the film Purely Belter
 bess - "please ya bess" for "please yourself"
 te boule - to roll, however te boule aboot means to "mess around"
 bray - to overpower or defeat someone, usually in a physical sense
 byer - cattle shed
 cannet or canna - cannot
 canny - "pleasant", or like in Scots "quite" (therefore something could be described as "canny canny")
 chud - chewing gum
 clart or clarts - "mud" as in "there's clarts on yor beuts"
 cuddy - a small horse or a pony
 te dee - do
 deeks - "look" as in "Gie’s a deeks" - "Gimme a look"
dinnet, divvent or dinna - "don't"
 divvie - an insult, referring to a stupid person
 doon - down
 ee - oh, an exclamation of shock
 fitha, faatha  or fadder - "father"
 te gan - to go ("gannin" or "gaan" = going)
 gadgie - man
 git awesh - "go away"
 geet, varry - very
 gie's- "Give me", compare "Gimme"
 had / haud - "hold" example: keep ahad means "keep ahold" or "look after", and haud yor gob means "keep quiet".]
 hev or hae - have
 hacky - "dirty"
 haddaway - "get away"
 hairn (or hen) - similar to "hinny", see below
 hinny a term of endearment - "Honey"
 hoose - house
 ho'wair, ho'way or ha'way - "come on"
 te hoy - to throw
 hyem - "home"
 us- me, for example Pass us the gully meaning "Pass me the knife"
 ket - sweets
 te knaw / te knaa - know
  - electricity, or electric
 te lend - often used for borrow, (lend us a bi meaning "Can I borrow a pen?")
 like - used as a filler in many sentences; usually every other word, e.g. like, is he on aboot me or like, summat, like?
 mair for "more" (compare with German "mehr")
 mam/ma a variation of Mother
 man - often used as a generic term of address, as in "Giv uz it heor noo man" or "haway man"
 marra - Friend. Used like "mate" - aareet marra meaning "hello friend")
 me or ma - my (compare: myself > meself or mesel)
 mollycoddle - overprotect, "wrap in cotton wool"
 muckle - similar to "canny", in the sense of meaning "quite". It can also mean "big", for instance "Yon hoose hez a muckle windae" means "that house has a big window"
 ner, na or nar - no
 neb - nose (nebby = nosey)
 neet - night
 nettie - toilet
 nivvor - never
 noo - now,
 nowt - nothing
 owt - anything
 pet - a term of address or endearment towards a woman or a child
 plodge - to stomp about or wade through something ungracefully
 radge or radgie - crazy
 sel - "self" as in mesel = myself, yersel = yourself, hesel = himself, horsel = herself, 
 shuttin for "shooting" thus simply shortening the "oo" vowel sound
 snek - nose
 spelk - a splinter
 stot - to bounce. A well-known local bread bun called a 'stottie cake' receives its name from the fact the dough is 'stotted' about when being made.
 summat or summick - something
 tab - cigarette
 tiv or te - to. The former is usually used when the following word begins with a vowel. There's nowt tiv it - "there's nothing to it"
 toon - town (or specifically Newcastle)
 wa - "our". used in a more general sense unlike "wor" below as in "Divvint touch wa bags" means "Don't touch our bags"
 willent, winnit - "won't"
 wor - our, Used primarily to denote a family member, such as "wor bairn"
 wu - "us" in Northumberland and Tyneside as in What ye deein te wu? means "What are you doing to us?". "us" is used in Durham and Wearside.
 yark - verb meaning to hit or move abrasively. Believed to be a corruption of "jerk"
 ye or 'ee for you as in What are 'ee deein meaning "What are you doing?"
 yor, thee - your

See also
Northumbria (modern)

References

Further reading
Thomas Moody, The Mid-Northumbrian Dialect, 2007
Bill Griffiths, A Dictionary of North East Dialect, 2005
Cecil Geeson, A Northumberland & Durham Word book, 1969
Richard Oliver Heslop, Northumberland Words. A Glossary of Words Used in the County of Northumberland & on the Tyneside. 1893

External links
Northumbrian dictionary
Northumbrian Language Society
Northumbrian Words Project
Northumbriana
Northumbrian wiki in Miraheze (Incubator plus)
Northumbrian Language Dictionary
A glossary of words used in the County of Northumberland and on the Tyneside
Poetry in Northumbrian

English language in England
North East England
Languages of the United Kingdom